Aerolite may refer to:
 Aero-Works Aerolite 103, an ultralight aircraft
 AeroLites, Inc., an American aircraft manufacturer
 NER 66 Aerolite, a steam locomotive
 Aerolite (adhesive), a wood adhesive